Álvaro Herrera Mendoza (born May 14, 1990) is a Mexican mixed martial artist competing in the Lightweight division. A professional competitor since 2008, he competed in the Ultimate Fighting Championship and was also a contestant on The Ultimate Fighter: Latin America 2.

Background 
Herrera was born in Guadalajara, Jalisco, Mexico. He is a university student, majoring in bio-pharmaceutical chemistry. He fought primary in Mexico prior he was selected to be one of the cast members in The Ultimate Fighter: Latin America 2, UFC The Ultimate Fighter TV series, and later signed by UFC.

Mixed martial arts career

Early career
Herrera began his professional mixed martial arts career in 2008. While on the regional circuit in South America, he competed primarily in his home country of Mexico. He amassed a record of 8–3 prior to trying out for UFC's Latin America developmental program and was accepted into it.

The Ultimate Fighter: Latin America 2 
After training at Jackson's MMA at UFC's expense, Herrera was selected as one of the cast members for The Ultimate Fighter: Latin America 2, UFC The Ultimate Fighter TV series, under Team Efrain Escudero in April 2015.

In the elimination round, Herrera lost the fight to Hector Aldana by unanimous decision.

Ultimate Fighting Championship
Herrera made his promotional debut on November 21, 2015 at The Ultimate Fighter Latin America 2 Finale in Monterrey, Nuevo Leon, Mexico. He faced Vernon Ramos and defeated Ramos via KO in round one.

He next faced Vicente Luque on July 7, 2016 at UFC Fight Night: dos Anjos vs. Alvarez. He lost the fight in round two via Brabo choke.

Herrera was expected to face Alex Ricci at UFC Fight Night: Lewis vs. Browne. However, Herrera pulled out of the fight in mid-January citing injury and was replaced by Paul Felder.

Herrera faced Jordan Rinaldi on August 5, 2017 at UFC Fight Night: Pettis vs. Moreno in a lightweight bout. He lost the fight via submission in the first round.

Herrera faced Devin Powell on July 28, 2018 at UFC on Fox 30. He lost the fight via knockout due to kicks to the body in the first round.

Post-UFC career
After parting ways with the UFC, Herrera signed with Combate Americas and made his promotional debut against Ignacio Capella at Combate 32 on March 8, 2019. He lost the fight via first-round knockout.

Championships and accomplishments

Mixed martial arts
Black Fighting Championship'
Black Fighting Championship Welterweight Champion (One time) vs. Jorge Campos Negrete
Black jaguar Fights
Black jaguar Fights Welterweight Champion (One time) vs. Gabriel Alamilla

Personal life
Herrera is a student at the university studying bio-pharmaceutical chemistry.

Mixed martial arts record

|-
|Loss
|align=center| 9–7
|Ignacio Capella
|TKO (punches)
|Combate 32: Mexico vs. Spain
|
|align=center|1
|align=center|2:59
|Guadalajara, Jalisco, Mexico
|
|-
|Loss
|align=center| 9–6
|Devin Powell
|TKO (body kicks and punches)
|UFC on Fox: Alvarez vs. Poirier 2 
|
|align=center|1
|align=center|1:52
|Calgary, Alberta, Canada
|
|-
|Loss
|align=center| 9–5
|Jordan Rinaldi
|Submission (Von Flue choke)
|UFC Fight Night: Pettis vs. Moreno
|
|align=center|1
|align=center|2:01
|Mexico City, Mexico
|
|-
| Loss
| align=center| 9–4
| Vicente Luque
| Submission (D'Arce choke)
| UFC Fight Night: dos Anjos vs. Alvarez
| 
| align=center| 2
| align=center| 3:52
| Las Vegas, Nevada, United States
|
|-
| Win
| align=center| 9–3
| Vernon Ramos
| KO (punches)
| The Ultimate Fighter Latin America 2 Finale: Magny vs. Gastelum
| 
| align=center| 1
| align=center| 0:30
| Monterrey, Mexico
|
|-
| Win
| align=center| 8–3
| Jorge Campos Negrete
| Submission (guillotine choke)
| Black Fighting Championships 6
| 
| align=center| 1
| align=center| 3:15
| Jalisco, Mexico
| 
|-
| Loss
| align=center| 7–3
| Gabriel Toussaint
| TKO (doctor stoppage)
| Mazatlan Extreme Fighting
| 
| align=center| 2
| align=center| 5:00
| Mazatlan, Mexico
|
|-
| Win
| align=center| 7–2
| Gabriel Alamilla
| Submission (guillotine choke)
| Black Jaguar Fights
| 
| align=center| 2
| align=center| 3:20
| Cancun, Mexico
|
|-
| Win
| align=center| 6–2
| Jorge Campos Negrete
| TKO (punches)
| GEX Cage Tournament: Old Jack's Fight Night - Payback
| 
| align=center| 2
| align=center| 2:54
| Jalisco, Mexico
|
|-
| Win
| align=center| 5–2
| Elias Diaz
| DQ
| GEX Cage Tournament: Old Jack's Fight Night VIP 4
| 
| align=center| 0
| align=center| 0:00
| Jalisco, Mexico
|
|-
| Loss
| align=center| 4–2
| Jimmer Hernandez
| KO (punch)
| Supreme Kombat Challenge 3
| 
| align=center| 1
| align=center| 0:04
| Jalisco, Mexico
|
|-
| Win
| align=center| 4–1
| David Gonzalez Guerra
| Submission (triangle armbar)
| GEX Cage Tournament 5
| 
| align=center| 2
| align=center| 1:58
| Jalisco, Mexico
|
|-
| Win
| align=center| 3–1
| Álvaro Laguna
| KO (punches)
| Calle 2 Fight Night
| 
| align=center| 1
| align=center| 1:47
| Jalisco, Mexico
|
|-
| Win
| align=center| 2–1
| Houston Ortega
| KO (punches)
| Black Fighting Championships 5
| 
| align=center| 1
| align=center| 2:02
| Jalisco, Mexico
|
|-
| Loss
| align=center| 1–1
| David Gonzalez Guerra
| Submission (rear-naked hoke)
| GEX Cage Tournament: Gladiadores Extremos
| 
| align=center| 1
| align=center| 2:40
| Jalisco, Mexico
|
|-
| Win
| align=center| 1–0
| Houston Ortega
| TKO (punches)
| Black Fighting Championships 4
| 
| align=center| 2
| align=center| 1:16
| Jalisco, Mexico
|
|-

See also
 List of current UFC fighters
 List of male mixed martial artists

References

External links
 
  

Living people
1990 births
Mexican male mixed martial artists
Welterweight mixed martial artists
Lightweight mixed martial artists
Sportspeople from Guadalajara, Jalisco
Ultimate Fighting Championship male fighters